Menedemus of Pyrrha (Lesbos) (fl. c. 350 BC, was a member of Plato's Academy, during the time of Speusippus. Upon the death of Speusippus in 339 BC, an election was held for the next scholarch of the Academy.  Menedemus and Heraclides narrowly lost to Xenocrates. Menedemus left the Academy, and set up a school of his own.

Notes

Academic philosophers
Classical Greek philosophers
4th-century BC Greek people
4th-century BC philosophers